Hypochlorosis ancharia is a butterfly in the family Lycaenidae. It is found on Waigeo in Indonesia, and in the Dampier Archipelago in the north of Australia.

Subspecies
Hypochlorosis ancharia ancharia (Indonesia: Waigeo)
Hypochlorosis ancharia tenebrosa Rothschild, 1915 (New Guinea: Dampier Island)

References

, 1977. Butterflies of the Australian Region, edn 2. 415 pp. Melbourne.
, 1894. Descriptions of three new Lycaenidae from New Guinea. Annals and Magazine of Natural History (6)13: 252-255.
, 1916. Gross-Schmetterlinge der Erde. Die Indo-Australischen Tagfalter. Vol. 9. Stuttgart.
, 1863-1878.  Illustrations of Diurnal Lepidoptera, Lycaenidae. London, van Vorst, x + 229 pp. Text Plates.
, 1998. The Butterflies of Papua New Guinea Academic Press, 

Butterflies described in 1869
Theclinae
Butterflies of Indonesia
Butterflies of Australia
Taxa named by William Chapman Hewitson